Hidden Disabilities Sunflower is a British scheme and company created to help people with hidden disabilities navigate and find help in public places.

History
The scheme was created in 2016 by Gatwick Airport and various charities.
In April 2019, London North Eastern Railway became the first railway company to recognize the scheme. By July 2020, all British railway companies had adopted the sunflower lanyard scheme as a means for passengers to let staff members know they may need more assistance, and that they may be medically exempt from wearing a face covering.

The scheme has now been adopted by airports in the United States, including Tulsa International Airport and Central Illinois Regional Airport.

Distribution 
Sunflower lanyards and badges can be obtained for free at participating venues or purchased directly from the Hidden Disabilities Sunflower company website. Hidden Disabilities Sunflower have criticized the resale of their products at inflated costs, and the sale of counterfeit products on websites including Amazon and eBay.

Usage
The sunflower lanyards are intended to let staff members know that the wearer has a hidden disability and as a result may take longer or need extra assistance. Staff members are trained to spot the lanyards and help the wearer.

During the COVID-19 pandemic, concerns were raised that the lanyards were being abused by non-disabled people for the purposes of avoiding wearing a face covering. Such usage has been criticized by Hidden Disabilities Sunflower, who have stated that only people who consider themselves to have a hidden disability (whether diagnosed or not) should wear the lanyard.

References

External links
 Official website

Disability in the United Kingdom
Disability culture
Accessible transportation